West Norriton Township is a township in Montgomery County, Pennsylvania,  United States. It is part of the Norristown Area School District. The population of the township was 15,663 at the 2010 census.

History 
On March 9, 1909, Norriton Township was divided into East Norriton Township and West Norriton Township.

Geography

Transportation

U.S. Route 422 is the most prominent highway serving West Norriton, briefly passing through the southwestern corner. Pennsylvania Route 363 interchanges with US 422 and heads northeast along Trooper Road before veering northwest out of the township.

Demographics

As of the 2010 census, the township was 81.1% White, 9.0% Black or African American, 0.1% Native American, 5.2% Asian, 0.1% Native Hawaiian and Other Pacific Islander, and 1.7% were two or more races. 3.1% of the population were of Hispanic or Latino ancestry.

As of the census of 2000, there were 14,901 people, 6,614 households, and 3,842 families residing in the township.  The population density was 2,543.9 people per square mile (981.8/km2).  There were 6,890 housing units at an average density of 1,176.3/sq mi (454.0/km2).  The racial makeup of the township was 89.49% White, 6.10% African American, 0.07% Native American, 2.73% Asian, 0.05% Pacific Islander, 0.48% from other races, and 1.07% from two or more races. Hispanic or Latino of any race were 1.58% of the population.

There were 6,614 households, out of which 22.2% had children under the age of 18 living with them, 47.7% were married couples living together, 7.7% had a female householder with no husband present, and 41.9% were non-families. 33.3% of all households were made up of individuals, and 10.6% had someone living alone who was 65 years of age or older.  The average household size was 2.23 and the average family size was 2.90.

In the township the population was spread out, with 19.0% under the age of 18, 6.7% from 18 to 24, 35.0% from 25 to 44, 23.7% from 45 to 64, and 15.5% who were 65 years of age or older.  The median age was 39 years. For every 100 females there were 91.9 males.  For every 100 females age 18 and over, there were 86.7 males.

The median income for a household in the township was $55,086, and the median income for a family was $65,701. Males had a median income of $44,211 versus $37,192 for females. The per capita income for the township was $28,497.  About 2.1% of families and 3.1% of the population were below the poverty line, including 2.0% of those under age 18 and 6.4% of those age 65 or over.

Government and politics

Cemeteries
Montgomery Cemetery
Riverside Cemetery

Education
Norristown Area School District is the area school district.

The Roman Catholic Archdiocese of Philadelphia operates Visitation B.V.M. School in West Norriton Township. near but not in the Trooper census-designated place. Mother Teresa Regional Catholic School in King of Prussia is another local Catholic school. Mother Teresa formed in 2012 by the merger of St. Teresa of Avila in West Norriton and Mother of Divine Providence in King of Prussia.

References

External links

 West Norriton Township official website

Census-designated places in Montgomery County, Pennsylvania
Townships in Montgomery County, Pennsylvania